Scuola Italiana Roma di Algeri is a private Italian international school in Algiers, Algeria. It includes the Pinocchio preschool and serves up to upper secondary school. It was formerly in another campus in Algiers.

The Kindergarten established operations in the 2009-2010 school year.

The kindergarten, primary school, and secondary school level I were recognized by the Italian Ministry of Foreign Affairs (MAE) decree No. 3811 of 7 May 2009 but was not recognised at that point. The MAE put the liceo (upper secondary school) in its Italian schools abroad list as part of decree no. 2540 of 31 January 2014 and it was legalized on 26 June 2014.

References

External links

  Scuola Italiana Roma di Algeri
  

Schools in Algiers
Italian international schools in Africa
International schools in Algeria
Educational institutions with year of establishment missing